Louis Bourgeois may refer to:

Louis Bourgeois (composer) (1510–1559), French composer
Louis Bourgeois (architect) (1856–1930), Canadian architect
Louis Bourgeois (footballer), French footballer

See also
Louise Bourgeois, French-American artist